The 2014 Guam gubernatorial election took place on November 4, 2014, to elect the Governor of Guam. Incumbent Republican Governor Eddie Calvo, who was elected in 2010, sought re-election for a second four-year term. The Governor and Lieutenant Governor of Guam are elected on the same ticket.

Calvo won the election with 64 percent of the vote, defeating Gutierrez. , this was the last time a Republican won the governorship of Guam.

Background
The 2014 gubernatorial race was essentially a rematch of the 2010 gubernatorial election. In 2010, Eddie Calvo, a Republican, defeated the Democratic nominee, former Governor Carl Gutierrez (1995–2003), with 50.61% of the vote. Calvo took office in January 2011.

Governor Eddie Calvo and Lt. Governor Ray Tenorio announced their intention to seek re-election for a second, four-year term. The team held the first official rally to kickoff their campaign on June 7, 2014, at their campaign headquarters in Anigua, following a motorcade of supporters from Yigo.

In contrast to the Republicans, the Democratic Party of Guam was initially unable to find a candidate willing to run against Governor Calvo in the 2014 contest. Noting the lack of a nominee, former Governor Carl Gutierrez, who initially declined to enter the election, announced his intention to run for governor on June 26, 2014, just days before the July 1 filing deadline. Gutierrez chose Gary Gumataotao, an attorney, as his running mate. Gutierrez and Gumataotao filed their candidacy papers on June 30, 2014, followed by a campaign rally in Hagåtña.

Candidates

Republican candidate
Eddie Calvo, incumbent Governor of Guam (since 2011)
 Running mate: Ray Tenorio, incumbent Lieutenant Governor of Guam (since 2011)

Democratic candidate
Carl Gutierrez, former Governor of Guam (1995–2003), 2010 Democratic gubernatorial nominee.
 Running mate: Gary Gumataotao, attorney

Endorsements
Former First Lady of Guam Joanne Camacho (2003–2011), a Republican and former General Manager of the Guam Visitors Bureau, endorsed Gutierrez for governor in the election. Rumors of a potential split in the Republican Party of Guam between factions loyal to either Governor Calvo or former Governor Felix Perez Camacho spread following her endorsement.

Results

Primary Election

General election

Results

References

Gubernatorial
Guam
Guam